This is a list of electoral divisions and wards in the ceremonial county of Cheshire in North West England. All changes since the re-organisation of local government following the passing of the Local Government Act 1972 are shown. The number of councillors elected for each electoral division or ward is shown in brackets.

Unitary authority councils

Cheshire East
Wards from 1 April 2009 (first election 1 May 2008) to 5 May 2011:

Wards from 5 May 2011 to present:

Cheshire West and Chester
Wards from 1 April 2009 (first election 1 May 2008) to 5 May 2011:

Wards from 5 May 2011 to 2 May 2019:

Wards from 2 May 2019 to present:

Halton
Wards from 1 April 1974 (first election 7 June 1973) to 6 May 1976:

Wards from 6 May 1976 to 8 May 1986:

Wards from 8 May 1986 to 1 May 1997:

Wards from 1 May 1997 to 10 June 2004:

Wards from 10 June 2004 to 6 May 2021:

Wards from 6 May 2021 to present:

Warrington
Wards from 1 April 1974 (first election 7 June 1973) to 3 May 1979:

Wards from 3 May 1979 to 2 May 1991:

Wards from 2 May 1991 to 1 May 1997:

Wards from 1 May 1997 to 10 June 2004:

Wards from 10 June 2004 to 5 May 2016:

Wards from 5 May 2016 to present:

Former county council

Cheshire
Electoral Divisions from 1 April 1974 (first election 12 April 1973) to 7 May 1981:

Electoral Divisions from 7 May 1981 to 7 June 2001:

Electoral Divisions from 7 June 2001 to 1 April 2009 (county council abolished):

Former district councils

Chester
Wards from 1 April 1974 (first election 7 June 1973) to 3 May 1979:

Wards from 3 May 1979 to 6 May 1999:

Wards from 6 May 1999 to 1 April 2009 (district abolished):

Congleton
Wards from 1 April 1974 (first election 7 June 1973) to 6 May 1976:

Wards from 6 May 1976 to 6 May 1999:

Wards from 6 May 1999 to 1 April 2009 (district abolished):

Crewe and Nantwich
Wards from 1 April 1974 (first election 7 June 1973) to 3 May 1979:

Wards from 3 May 1979 to 6 May 1999:

Wards from 6 May 1999 to 1 April 2009 (district abolished):

Ellesmere Port and Neston
Wards from 1 April 1974 (first election 7 June 1973) to 6 May 1976:

Wards from 6 May 1976 to 6 May 1999:

Wards from 6 May 1999 to 1 April 2009 (district abolished):

Macclesfield
Wards from 1 April 1974 (first election 7 June 1973) to 3 May 1979:

Wards from 3 May 1979 to 6 May 1999:

Wards from 6 May 1999 to 1 April 2009 (district abolished):

Vale Royal
Wards from 1 April 1974 (first election 7 June 1973) to 6 May 1976:

Wards from 6 May 1976 to 6 May 1999:

Wards from 6 May 1999 to 1 April 2009 (district abolished):

Electoral wards by constituency
The current parliamentary constituency boundaries have been in use since the 2010 United Kingdom general election, and were defined according to electoral wards as they existed in 2007.

City of Chester
Blacon Hall, Blacon Lodge, Boughton, Boughton Heath, Christleton, City & St Anne’s, College, Curzon & Westminster, Dodleston, Handbridge & St Mary’s, Hoole All Saints, Hoole Groves, Huntington, Lache Park, Mollington, Newton Brook, Newton St Michaels, Saughall, Upton Grange, Upton Westlea, Vicars Cross.

Congleton
Alsager Central, Alsager East, Alsager West, Astbury, Brereton, Buglawton, Congleton Central, Congleton North, Congleton North West, Congleton South, Congleton West, Dane Valley, Holmes Chapel, Lawton, Middlewich Cledford, Middlewich Kinderton, Odd Rode, Sandbach East, Sandbach North, Sandbach West.

Crewe and Nantwich
Alexandra, Barony Weaver, Birchin, Coppenhall, Delamere, Englesea, Grosvenor, Haslington, Leighton, Maw Green, St Barnabas, St John’s, St Mary’s, Shavington, Valley, Waldron, Wellington, Wells Green, Willaston, Wistaston Green, Wybunbury.

Eddisbury
Acton, Audlem, Barrow, Bunbury, Cuddington & Oakmere, Davenham & Moulton, Farndon, Kelsall, Malpas, Mara, Minshull, Peckforton, Tarvin, Tattenhall, Tilston, Waverton, Winsford Over, Winsford Swanlow, Winsford Verdin, Winsford Wharton, Wrenbury.

Ellesmere Port and Neston
Burton & Ness, Central, Elton, Grange, Groves, Ledsham, Little Neston, Mickle Trafford, Neston, Parkgate, Pooltown, Rivacre, Riverside, Rossmore, Stanlow & Wolverham, Strawberry Fields, Sutton, Sutton Green & Manor, Westminster, Whitby, Willaston & Thornton.

Halton
Appleton, Birchfield, Broadheath, Castlefields, Ditton, Farnworth, Grange, Hale, Halton Brook, Halton View, Heath, Hough Green, Kingsway, Mersey, Riverside.

Macclesfield
Bollington Central, Bollington East, Bollington West, Disley & Lyme Handley, Gawsworth, Henbury, Macclesfield Bollinbrook, Macclesfield Broken Cross, Macclesfield Central, Macclesfield East, Macclesfield Hurdsfield, Macclesfield Ivy, Macclesfield Ryles, Macclesfield South, Macclesfield Tytherington, Macclesfield West, Poynton Central, Poynton East, Poynton West, Prestbury, Rainow, Sutton.

Tatton
Alderley Edge, Barnton, Chelford, Cogshall, Dean Row, Fulshaw, Handforth, High Legh, Hough, Knutsford Bexton, Knutsford Nether, Knutsford Norbury Booths, Knutsford Over, Lacey Green, Lostock & Wincham, Mere, Mobberley, Morley & Styal, Plumley, Rudheath & South Witton, Seven Oaks & Marston, Shakerley.

Weaver Vale
Beechwood, Daresbury, Forest, Frodsham North, Frodsham South, Halton Lea, Hartford & Whitegate, Helsby, Kingsley, Leftwich & Kingsmead, Milton Weaver, Northwich Castle, Northwich Winnington, Northwich Witton, Norton North, Norton South, Weaverham, Windmill Hill.

Warrington North
Birchwood, Burtonwood and Winwick, Culcheth, Glazebury and Croft, Fairfield and Howley, Orford, Poplars and Hulme, Poulton North, Poulton South, Rixton and Woolston, Westbrook.

Warrington South
Appleton, Bewsey and Whitecross, Grappenhall and Thelwall, Great Sankey North, Great Sankey South, Hatton, Stretton and Walton, Latchford East, Latchford West, Lymm, Penketh and Cuerdley, Stockton Heath, Whittle Hall.

See also

List of parliamentary constituencies in Cheshire

References

Politics of Cheshire
Cheshire
Wards